Tatiana Viktorovna Stepanova, also Tetiana Stepanova, (Tetiana Viktorivna Stepanova) (born 1962, Odessa, Ukraine then Soviet Union) is a Ballet master, choreographer, ballet dancer, critic, essayist and historian of the dance.

Biography
Tatiana Stepanova began her ballet training in the Special School of Ballet of Odessa (Ukraine) as a student of Klaudia Vasina, who was a disciple of the great Russian dancer and teacher Agrippina Vaganova. She completed her dance training at the State School of Ballet and Choreography of Minsk² (Belarus) where she was a pupil of Vera Shvetsova (distinguished disciple of Agrippina Vaganova), who danced in the Maly Theatre of Saint Petersburg (Russia) and in the Great Theater of Opera and Ballet of Riga (Latvia).

Stepanova graduated in Choreographic Art from the Saint Petersburg Conservatory³, Russia (The N.A. Rimsky-Korsakov Saint Petersburg State Conservatory), where she studied with Gabriella Komleva, Nikita Dolgushin and Nicolai Boyarchikov, great dancers of the Mariinsky Theatre (before Kirov Ballet) and of the Mikhaylovsky Theatre (before Maly Theatre) both in Saint Petersburg.

She danced as the soloist in the Odessa Opera and Ballet Theater¹ (Ukraine) and in the Great Theater of Ballet of Minsk² (Belarus).

Since 1985, is a Teacher of Ballet, giving classes in Odessa (Ukraine), Saratov and Saint Petersburg (Russia), Madrid, Valencia, Puertollano and Lugo (Spain) and Ashiya and Nishinomiya (Japan)

Founder and Artistic Director of the Institute of Investigation and Studies of Dance (Instituto de Investigación y Estudios de Danza) in Madrid (Spain).

Stepanova has published numerous articles of criticism in newspapers and weeklies in Ukraine (Vecherniaya Odessal), Russia (Glásnost, Perestroika and Dance), Spain (El Cultural of La Razón) and United States.

As a teacher intent on purity and on the maintenance of choreographic heritage of classical ballet, Stepanova created a short version of The Sleeping Beauty (1h 20'), which best maintains the heritage of Marius Petipa in the steps that are conserved as well as in those that are added in his style. This version premiered December seven, 2008, in the Hyogo Performing Arts Center4 (Nishinomiya, Japan), under the title of Sleeping Beauty Suite.

Currently, Tatyana Stepanova directs the Institute of Investigation and Studies of Dance in Madrid, (Spain) and is the Artistic Director of the AIS Ballet Japan in Ashiya (Japan).

Choreographic work

Miniature
 Incrustación carmesí (2002) Crimson Inlay
 Dama rota (2002) Broken Lady
 El Chocolate del loro (2003) The Chocolate of the parrot
 Torre eclipsada (2005) Tower eclipsed
 Jaula de vientos (2005) Cage of winds
 Jaula de loros (2006) Cage of parrots
 Suite azul (2006) Blue Suite
 Remolinos de Naruto (2007) Swirls of Naruto
 Arcadia (2007) Arcady
 Nectar amargo (2007) Nectar bitter
 The death of the nine swans (2009)

Madrid's Choreographic
 Arena (Sports Suite) (2004) music of D. Shostakovich.
 Nieblas en Baden-Baden (Fogs in Baden-Baden) (2005) Recognized as one of the few Criminal Ballet that exist, where a detective investigation is danced, starred in by José Antonio Checa.
 Mozarito (2006), with music of Mozart and for the purpose of honoring to the same one in the 250 anniversary of its birth, was starred in by the dancer José Antonio Checa and sponsored by the Department of the Arts of the Community of Madrid. Dance and rolled in the Palace of the Duke of Ugena, historic headquarters of the Chamber of Commerce and Industry of Madrid (Cámara de Comercio e Industria de Madrid).

Ashiya's Diptych
Stepanova is known for the Ashiya's Diptych, a suite of works of Marius Petipa. She reinterpreted the pieces in such a way that her choreography seamlessly combines with that of Petipa.

 Sleeping Beauty Suite (2008), (1h 20'),  Music of Tchaikovsky
 La Bayadède (2010), (1h 33'),  Music of Minkus,  This version premiered itself January 24, 2010 in the Grand Hall of Hyogo Performing Arts Center, (Nishinomiya, Japan)

See also
 List of Russian ballet dancers

References
 Official page of Odessa Opera and Ballet Theater
 Official page of National Academy of the Great Theater of Ballet of the Republic of Belarus
 Official page of Saint Petersburg Conservatory Rimsky-Korsakov
 Official page of Hyōgo Performing Arts Center

External links
 http://www.conservatory.ru Web site of Saint Petersburg Conservatory Rimsky-Korsakov, Russian and English.
 http://www.ais-ballet.com Japanese.
 http://www.gcenter-hyogo.jp Japanese and English.
 http://www.nacbibl.org.by/ Web site of National Academy of the Great Theater of Ballet of the Republic of Belarus, Russian and English.
 http://www.elcultural.es/version_papel/TEATRO/13991/Bailes_para_la_primavera/

Ballet teachers
Ballet choreographers
Russian choreographers
Spanish choreographers
Russian ballerinas
1962 births
Living people